Leap of Faith is the seventh album by the group Shooting Star. It is the last Shooting Star album to feature vocalist Keith Mitchell and drummer Rod Lincoln; as well as the only album to feature violinist Christian Howes.  Two versions of the CD were released, one with bonus tracks and a different order of the tracks.

Track listing

Bonus Track listing

Personnel
Van McLain – guitars, lead vocals
Keith Mitchell – lead vocals
Christian Howes – violin
Dennis Laffoon – keyboards, vocals
Rod Lincoln – drums
Ron Verlin – bass

Additional personnel
Kevin Beamish – backing vocals
Gary Charlsen – backing vocals

References

2000 albums
Shooting Star (band) albums